Nothobranchius annectens is a species of fish in the family Nothobranchiidae. It is endemic to Tanzania.  Its natural habitats is weedy pools.

References

Links
 Nothobranchius annectens on WildNothos

annectens
Fish described in 1998
Fish of Tanzania
Endemic fauna of Tanzania
Taxonomy articles created by Polbot